The Reverend Paul Joseph Fitzgerald, S.J. is a Roman Catholic priest and member of the Society of Jesus. Father Fitzgerald is the 28th president of the University of San Francisco.

Biography

Rev. Paul J. Fitzgerald, S.J., is the 28th President of the University of San Francisco. Most recently, he served as the Senior Vice President for Academic Affairs at Fairfield University. He has lived, studied and worked in Germany, France, Switzerland, Mexico, China and Kenya. His academic accomplishments include doctoral degrees in Theology and in the Sociology of Religion, a long list of publications, more than twenty years of college level instruction and more than a decade of higher education administrative experience.

External links 
Official Biography
From the USF Newsroom
Presidential Inauguration
USF Magazine
"USF Warmly Welcomes Father Paul J. Fitzgerald as 28th University President"

Living people
20th-century American Jesuits
21st-century American Jesuits
Santa Clara University alumni
American Roman Catholic priests
Presidents of the University of San Francisco
Year of birth missing (living people)